XX is a two-disc compilation album by American alternative rock group O.A.R. (Of A Revolution). It was released August 5, 2016 by Vanguard Records.  The album was released to celebrate the band's twenty-year career and features songs from the band's past catalogue, two new songs and a second disc of live songs.

Reception
The album debuted at No. 31 on the Billboard 200 chart based on 13,000 units, 12,000 of which are pure album sales.  It also debuted at No. 5 on Top Rock Albums.

Track listing

Disc 1

Disc 2

Charts

References

O.A.R. albums
2016 albums